Wadi Salih is a province of Central Darfur state of Sudan.  On March 5, 2004, at least 145 people were killed by  Janjaweed forces. It is South of Zalingei.
It is between Mukjar and Habillah regions.

External links

Geography of Sudan
Central Darfur